Tiroda Thermal Power Station is a coal-based thermal power plant located near Tirora in Gondia district, Maharashtra. The power plant is operated by the Adani Power.

Capacity
It has a planned capacity of 3300 MW (5x660 MW).

References

Coal-fired power stations in Maharashtra
Gondia district
Year of establishment missing
Adani Group